Österängen Church is a church building at Österängen in Jönköping in Sweden. Belonging to the Christina-Ljungarum Parish of the Church of Sweden, it was inaugurated on First Advent Sunday 1961.

References

20th-century Church of Sweden church buildings
Churches in Jönköping
Churches completed in 1961
Churches in the Diocese of Växjö